Anton Rochel (18 June 1770, in Neunkirchen – 12 May 1847, in Graz) was an Austrian surgeon and naturalist, known for his botanical investigations of Banat and the Carpathians.

Up until 1798 he served as a surgeon in the Austrian army, then from 1798 to 1820 worked as a physician in Moravia and Hungary. From 1820 to 1840 he was a curator at the botanical garden in Pest. 

The botanical genus Rochelia (in the family Boraginaceae) was named in his honor by Ludwig Reichenbach in 1824.

Published works 
 Naturhistorische miscellen uber den nordwestlichen Karpath in ober-Ungarn, 1821 – Natural history notes on the northwestern Carpathians in upper Hungary.
 Plantae Banatus rariores: iconibus et descriptionibus illustratae, 1828.
 Botanische Reise in das Banat im Jahre 1835 nebst Gelegenheits-Bemerkungen, 1838 – Botanical journey to Banat in 1835.

References 

1770 births
1847 deaths
People from Neunkirchen District, Austria
19th-century Austrian physicians